The 1992–93 Maltese Premier League was the 13th season of the Maltese Premier League, and the 78th season of top-tier football in Malta. It was contested by 10 teams, and Floriana F.C. won the championship.

League standings

Results

References
Malta - List of final tables (RSSSF)

Maltese Premier League seasons
Malta
1992–93 in Maltese football